Modi Rosenfeld (born April 29, 1970, in Tel Aviv, Israel as Mordechi Rosenfeld), known professionally as Modi (stylized as MODI) is a stand-up comedian and actor.

Early years
Modi was born in Tel Aviv, Israel and moved to Woodmere, New York, with his family when he was seven years old.  He graduated from George W. Hewlett High School in 1988 and Boston University in 1992, majoring in psychology and minoring in voice.

Modi studied cantorial music at Yeshiva University's Belz School of Music and continues to sing as a hobby at the synagogue where he prays. He was a Wall Street international banker for Merrill Lynch before entering comedy.

Career
Modi is an established headliner at comedy clubs across the United States and is a regular fixture on the comedy scene in both New York and Los Angeles. His home club is the Comedy Cellar. Modi's background and ability to adapt to a variety of audiences has allowed him to create a niche within the Jewish community, performing for Reform and Orthodox audiences around the world. He performed at the launch party of the late Israeli astronaut Ilan Ramon in Houston before takeoff.

Modi has contributed to US Weekly as a member of the fashion police and was also semi-finalist on the fourth season of Last Comic Standing. He is the host of his own podcast called And Here's Modi.

Modi claims Don Rickles, Jackie Mason, George Carlin and Louis CK as inspirations for his comedy. He says he attributes his comedic timing to Alan King.

He was honored by the City of New York through a proclamation declaring June 26, 2018 "Mordechi 'Modi' Rosenfeld Day."

Modi is the co-founder and producer of the Chosen Comedy Festival, along with comedians Elon Gold and Dani Zoldan.

Personal life
Modi is Jewish and is a member of the Sixth Street Community Synagogue, a Modern Orthodox congregation in Manhattan, where comedian Sandra Bernhard is also a member.

He is gay and is legally married to Leo Veiga, who is also his manager.

Filmography

Video games

See also 
 Mendy Pellin
 Meir Kay
 Adina Sash

References

External links
 MODI Live

Jewish American comedians
George W. Hewlett High School alumni
Boston University alumni
Yeshiva University alumni
People from Woodmere, New York
American stand-up comedians
Israeli stand-up comedians
Israeli emigrants to the United States
Israeli Jews
Hazzans
1970 births
Living people
21st-century American comedians
People from the Lower East Side
Orthodox and Hasidic Jewish comedians
Jewish American male comedians
Israeli male comedians
Jewish Israeli comedians
21st-century American Jews